Conor Moloney (born 18 July 2002) is an Irish rugby union player. He plays in the back-row and represents Limerick club Young Munster in the amateur All-Ireland League.

Young Munster
Moloney was part of the Young Munster team that defeated Garryowen 11–8 to win the 2021–22 Munster Senior Cup in March 2022.

Munster
Born in Kildysart, Moloney first began playing rugby with Ennis and represented Munster and Ireland at various underage levels, including 'A' level for Munster, as well as joining Young Munster in the AIL. Following the disruption caused by the province's recent tour to South Africa, Moloney was registered with Munster's Champions Cup squad, and made his senior competitive debut for Munster in their opening 2021–22 Champions Cup fixture away to English club Wasps on 12 December 2021, coming on as a replacement for John Hodnett in the province's 35–14 win alongside fellow Ennis RFC men Tony Butler and Ethan Coughlan.

Ireland
Moloney was selected in the Ireland under-20s squad for the 2022 Six Nations Under 20s Championship when it was announced in January 2022, and he made his competitive debut for the team in their 17–16 away win against France on 11 February. Ireland went on to win the Grand Slam in the tournament.

Honours

Young Munster
Munster Senior Cup:
Winner (1): 2021–22

Ireland under-20s
Six Nations Under 20s Championship:
Winner (1): 2022
Grand Slam:
Winner (1): 2022
 Triple Crown:
 Winner (1): 2022

References

External links

Ireland U20 Profile

2002 births
Living people
Rugby union players from County Clare
Irish rugby union players
Young Munster players
Munster Rugby players
Rugby union flankers
Rugby union number eights